Latericaecum is a genus of monopisthocotylean monogeneans, belonging to the family Diplectanidae.

Species
According to the World Register of Marine Species, the two valid species included in the genus are:
 Latericaecum cazauxi (Oliver & Paperna, 1984) Domingues & Boeger, 2008 
 Latericaecum pearsoni Young, 1969

References

Diplectanidae
Monogenea genera